Wellington Simião (born 23 February 1987) is a Brazilian football coach and former player who played as a midfielder.

Club career
Born in Poços de Caldas, Simião started his professional career in 2007 with Caldense and subsequently represented lower division clubs  - Luverdense, Metropolitano, Guarani. He also had a spell with Thai club Buriram United in 2010.

On 16 September 2016, Simião signed for second tier club Vila Nova after a stint with third tier Ituano. He scored his first goal for the club in a 2–1 defeat against Londrina on 24 September.

After having represented Ituano in local Campeonato Paulista, Simião joined first tier club Avaí in May 2017. In the following month, he suffered a fracture in his face during a match against Atlético-MG for which he had to be operated on.

On 28 December 2017, Simião joined Coritiba Football Club.

References

External links

1987 births
Living people
Association football midfielders
Brazilian footballers
Wellington Simiao
Ituano FC players
Vila Nova Futebol Clube players
Avaí FC players
Campeonato Brasileiro Série C players
Campeonato Brasileiro Série B players
Campeonato Brasileiro Série A players
Grêmio Esportivo Brasil players
Brazilian football managers
Luverdense Esporte Clube managers